Netball in Fiji is a popular sport, with a men's and a women's national team. Netball games are most often played by girls on Saturdays during the winter, though games can be played at all times of the year. Women's participation in netball is comparable to men's participation in rugby.

History
The sport started to grow in popularity during the 1970s. Continuing growth of the game in Fiji was at times hampered by the fact that the sport is not an Olympic one. For Olympic sports, money can be tapped to help cover costs for inter-island travel for international competitions. The lack of netball being recognized makes it harder to find money to cover these costs.

International competitions
Samoa and Fiji are traditional netball rivals.  This rivalry can be seen at events like Pacific Games.

Fiji was supposed to host the 2007 World Netball Championships, but a military coup caused the IFNA to move the championship to Auckland.

As of August 2016, the women's national team was ranked number seven in the world.

Fiji has a men's national team that has competed in the 2009 and 2011 International Challenge Men's and Mixed Netball Tournament.

Fiji U21 side competed in the 2017 Netball World Youth Cup in Botswana, Gaborone and placed 4th.
Highest ranking for any Fiji Netball side.

References

Bibliography

External links 
Oceania Sport